The Ceremony is a 1963 American crime film directed by Laurence Harvey and written by Ben Barzman. The film stars Laurence Harvey, Sarah Miles, Robert Walker Jr., John Ireland, Ross Martin, Lee Patterson, Jack MacGowran, Murray Melvin and Noel Purcell. The film was released on December 18, 1963, by United Artists.

Plot
The story is set in Tangier when it was an internationally controlled territory separate from Morocco during the years leading towards Morocco regaining its independence. 
Sean (Harvey) is held in a castle prison awaiting execution after a bank guard has been killed during a robbery. The robbery may have political implications. Various administrative officials want Sean to say where the money is and the execution is politically important to show that the administration is upholding the law. 
Sean, an atheist, refuses to see a priest, Fr O’Brien.  
Outside Sean’s girlfriend, Catherine, is drawn into an escape plot and intimacy with Sean’s brother, Dominic.  Catherine visits Sean and tells him to see a priest. Dominic arrives at the prison impersonating a priest and with the help of a guard they escape. 
Sean and Dominic are reunited with Catherine but they are traced by armed forces. Dominic gets to a car and leads the police away from the others as a decoy. He is chased until he is forced off the road and engulfed in his flaming car. Disfigured and thought to be Sean, he is brought back to prison for execution. Fr O’Brien finds Sean and reveals Dominic is awaiting execution telling Sean that his sacrifice is proof that God exists.  Most of the firing squad are disgusted at the execution and fire into the sky but Dominic is executed just before Sean arrives. Sean lifts up his body and declares to the other prisoners that his brother has died to save him.

Cast 
 Laurence Harvey as Sean McKenna
 Sarah Miles as Catherine
 Robert Walker Jr. as Dominic McKenna
 John Ireland as Prison Warden
 Ross Martin as Lecoq
 Lee Patterson as Nicky
 Jack MacGowran as O'Brian
 Murray Melvin as First Gendaime
 Noel Purcell as Finigan 
 Carlos Casaravilla as Ramades 
 Fernando Rey as Sanchez (dubbed by Robert Rietti)
 Fernando Sancho as Shaoush
 José Nieto as Inspector

See also
 List of American films of 1963

References

External links 
 

1963 films
1963 crime films
American black-and-white films
American crime films
American prison films
Films about capital punishment
Films about brothers
Films set in Tangier
United Artists films
1960s prison films
1960s English-language films
1960s American films